"Fix You" is a song by British rock band Coldplay. It was written by all four members of the band for their third studio album, X&Y (2005). It was released on 5 September 2005 as the second single from X&Y and reached number 4 on the UK Singles Chart. The song reached number 18 in the United States Billboard Hot Modern Rock Tracks. Promo singles were released for the UK and US.

The song was started by Chris Martin to comfort his then-wife, actress Gwyneth Paltrow, who he met in late 2002 after her father died. The track is built around an organ accompanied by piano and guitar in the first half and an alternative rock style in the second half featuring electric guitar, bass and drums. The hopeful message of the song, and its two-part acoustic/anthemic arrangement, was critically acclaimed. The song has been performed at memorials such as by Coldplay at the One Love Manchester benefit concert in 2017. In September 2021, the song was ranked number 392 on Rolling Stone magazine's list of the "500 Greatest Songs of All Time".

Background
Coldplay lead singer Chris Martin met American actress Gwyneth Paltrow in late October 2002, three weeks after the death of her father, television director Bruce Paltrow. As their relationship grew closer, Martin and Paltrow would listen to Coldplay's album Parachutes, especially the uplifting song "Everything's Not Lost," to help her process the loss of her father. Martin and Paltrow married in December 2003.

"Fix You" was inspired by Martin's wish to continue helping Paltrow get through her grief. He wanted to base the song on a church organ; instead he powered up a synthesizer given to Paltrow by her father, the instrument sitting unused in their house, to find "it had these amazing sounds on it." Martin said that the song's composition is influenced by English alternative rock band Elbow's 2003 anthem "Grace Under Pressure". In 2005, he described "Fix You" as "probably the most important song we've ever written". He wrote four other songs for or about Paltrow: "Moses" (2003), "Swallowed in the Sea" (2005), "Magic" and "Another's Arms" (2014).

All of Coldplay helped in writing the song. During a track-by-track analysis, bassist Guy Berryman observed that "Fix You" takes "a bit of inspiration" from "Many Rivers to Cross" by Jimmy Cliff (1969). Berryman added, "It becomes its own thing, kind of like points of inspiration that kind of lead you down certain paths. Whenever you want to write a song like someone else, it ultimately ends up sounding like something different anyway."

Arrangement

The song features an organ and piano in the key of E major. It begins as a hushed electric organ ballad, with Martin's falsetto. The song then builds in acoustic guitar and piano, accompanied by the sound of string instruments during the beginning choruses. The melody shifts to a plaintive three-note guitar line, ringing through a rhythmic upbeat drum tempo.  The song transitions to its bridge, which expands into a blend of piano, electric and bass guitar, drums, and a singalong chorus with an anthemic feel. Electronic sounds from a synthesiser join during the second half of the bridge. The song ends with the beginning chorus, with slow, melancholic piano notes being played in the background.

The message that Martin sings throughout, is of encouragement: "Lights will guide you home / And ignite your bones / And I will try to fix you." Michele Hatty of USA Weekend reported that Martin sings about recovering from grief in the song. Travis Gass of the Bangor Daily News wrote that Martin offers his sympathies for the downtrodden, with "When you love someone but it goes to waste / Could it be worse?"

Release
Capitol Records serviced "Fix You" to US triple A and alternative radio on 15 August 2005. In the UK, Parlophone released "Fix You" on 5 September 2005 as the second single from X&Y. The single was pressed with two B-sides: "The World Turned Upside Down" and "Pour Me". In Australia, the song was issued as a CD single on 12 September 2005. Two days later, the band released the Fix You EP in the iTunes Store. In response to Hurricane Katrina, all of the sales went to the American Red Cross Hurricane 2005 Relief and the National Academy of Recording Arts & Sciences' MusiCares Hurricane Relief Fund. Promotional singles were released in the UK and US.

The track peaked at number four in the UK Singles Chart on 17 September 2005. As of 30 July 2011, the song had spent 122 weeks on that chart.
It peaked at number 59 on the Billboard Hot 100 and number 18 on the Billboard Hot Modern Rock Tracks. The song also charted on the Billboard Pop 100 and Hot Digital Songs. The single appeared in Australia's Singles Chart in the number four position on 18 September 2005, after retiring in the 58 spot. It also appeared at number eight on the Irish Singles Chart and spent seven consecutive weeks on the chart. On 14 November 2010, the song re-entered the Australian singles chart at number 37.

In 2005, Coldplay performed the song live on Saturday Night Live and the Live 8 event in July. It has also become the anthem for the event.

In 2009, the song also appeared on Coldplay's live album, LeftRightLeftRightLeft.

On 19 October 2011, following Apple CEO Steve Jobs' death, a private memorial service was held and streamed for Apple employees during which the band played the song. Chris Martin remarked that when Jobs first heard the track ten years earlier, he didn't think the band would "make it." Steve Jobs was a longtime fan of Coldplay.

On 4 June 2017, Coldplay performed "Fix You" at the One Love Manchester benefit concert for the victims of the Manchester Arena bombing.

Reception
The song received widespread acclaim from music critics. Rolling Stone's Kelefa Sanneh wrote in her review for X&Y that "One of the best is 'Fix You', an unabashedly sentimental song where Martin delivers words of encouragement in a gentle falsetto [...] Proving once more that no band can deliver a stately rock ballad like this one." Paul McNamee of NME said "It’s a wonderful song that shifts from simple stark piano and voice to a ringing, clattering burst of intent and proto-prog four-part harmony." Meanwhile, Adrien Begrand from PopMatters named "Fix You" the best ballad from X&Y.

Rankings

Music video
The music video for "Fix You" was directed by Sophie Muller, who had previously worked with the band for their 2002 video "In My Place". The video was filmed at the end of two concerts on 4 and 5 July 2005 at the Reebok Stadium in Bolton, England, which were the band's first ever stadium performances. The concert goers doubled as extras for the video shoot, which required two takes on each day to complete.

In the first half of the video, Martin, wanders the streets of London starting at Tooley Street under London Bridge station, while the slogan "Make Trade Fair" is projected onto the Royal National Theatre, using the same Baudot code colour scheme on the cover of X&Y. The tunnels that Martin is seen wandering within are located both in and around King's Cross and St Pancras railway stations, with the filming for the video taking place during the time of the redevelopment and expansion of the latter. Martin is then seen walking across Waterloo Bridge, which crosses the River Thames, connecting the South Bank with The Strand. As soon as the electric guitar kicks in, Martin's walk turns into a run as he darts through streets of London, until very quickly reaching the side of the stage at the Reebok Stadium in Bolton, where he joins the rest of the band for the song's finale. The audience sings along with the song's final refrain, and at the end of the video Martin thanks them for their support and wishes them goodnight.

The video debuted on 1 August 2005. It was nominated at the 15th annual Music Video Production Association Awards in the category of Adult Contemporary. After its release, the music video was repurposed as a tribute to the victims of the 7 July 2005 London bombings, although it was filmed before they occurred.

In popular culture
The song appears in The Acoustic Album (2006). It was performed in 2006 by the New England octogenarian group Young@Heart Chorus. The group's performance was led by former chorus member Fred Knittle, who suffered from congestive heart failure and breathed with assistance from an oxygen tank. The performance was originally planned to be a duet between Knittle and Bob Salvini, another former chorus member, but Salvini died shortly before the show. Knittle performed it as a solo, as a tribute to his friend. The performance was initially recorded for a British documentary that aired on Channel 4; footage of the performance was uploaded to YouTube in November 2006 to positive response. An expanded version of the film, titled Young@Heart, debuted at the 2007 Los Angeles Film Festival and was released in US theatres in 2008. Knittle died on 1 January 2009, after a short battle with cancer, at the age of 83.

The song was featured in an episode of the American teen drama television series The O.C., and then in Without a Trace,  Cold Case, Brothers & Sisters, and The Newsroom. The Newsroom plays an extended version of the full song, while using the name as an inspiration for the title of the episode "I'll Try to Fix You," and also the theme (correcting an error in reported News before broadcasting it live). The half part of the song was played over the trailer for the 2006 film World Trade Center. It was also featured in the 2006 movie You, Me and Dupree. The track was nominated for an Ivor Novello Award in the category of Best Song Musically and Lyrically. The song was also nominated for a UK Festival Award in the category of Anthem of the Summer. On 14 March 2009, the band performed a rendition of the song at the relief concert, Sound Relief, in Sydney, Australia.

American rock band Yellowcard covered the song and included it as bonus material on the iTunes version of their 2012 album, Southern Air.

In December 2015 the song was used, alongside "Bridge over Troubled Water", in the UK charity Christmas No 1 mashup song "A Bridge Over You", by the choir of the Lewisham and Greenwich NHS Trust, selling more than 127,000 copies.

The song was referenced in the 2019 Beatles-tribute film Yesterday.

A string version of the song was also featured in the computer-animated adventure film Abominable (2019).

The song was also added toward the end of the Korean romance movie Tune in for Love.

English singer Sam Smith covered the song in May 2020, and released it as a single in July the same year.

South Korean boyband BTS covered the song in February 2021 for their MTV Unplugged appearance. The performance aired during the COVID-19 pandemic and one of the members, Jimin, shared, "This song gave us comfort, so we wanted to prepare this cover to comfort [their fans] as well." All four members of Coldplay praised the group, sharing the video on the official Coldplay Twitter feed and writing "아름다운", the Korean word for "beautiful". The two groups would later collaborate for the song "My Universe".

Ed Sheeran collaborated with Coldplay live at London's Shepherd's Bush Empire on October 12, 2021, at the launch show for Coldplay's 9th studio album, Music of the Spheres.

In November 2021, Kacey Musgraves covered the song for a stop-motion animation film from Chipotle called A Future Begins, which focused on the farming industry of the United States. It won a silver Clio Award for Use of Music in Film/Video – 61 Seconds to Five Minutes, with Coldplay being credited as the songwriters.

The song was used in the final episode of the Spanish heist drama Money Heist, which was released on Netflix in December 2021.

On 29 March 2022, American singer Camila Cabello covered "Fix You" as part of her set list on Concert for Ukraine, a benefit concert on ITV for the people affected by the 2022 Russian invasion of Ukraine.

Track listing

Personnel

 Chris Martin – lead vocals, organ, piano, acoustic guitar, synthesizer
 Jonny Buckland – lead electric guitar, backing vocals
 Guy Berryman – bass guitar, backing vocals
 Will Champion – drums, backing vocals

Charts

Weekly charts

Year-end charts

Certifications

Release history

References

External links

 

2000s ballads
2005 singles
2005 songs
Capitol Records singles
Coldplay songs
Hurricane Katrina disaster relief charity singles
Music videos directed by Sophie Muller
Parlophone singles
Rock ballads
Song recordings produced by Ken Nelson (British record producer)
Songs about death
Songs based on actual events
Songs written by Chris Martin
Songs written by Guy Berryman
Songs written by Jonny Buckland
Songs written by Will Champion